Yusuf Babangida Suleiman, more commonly known as Yusuf Dawo-dawo, a Nigerian politician and a lawmaker from Kano State member of the 7th, 8th and 9th Kano State House of Assembly

Early life and education 
Yusuf was born on 28 April 1976 in Gwale Local Government Area of Kano State he attended Kurmawa Primary School between 1983 and 1989, He also attended Government Secondary School Warure and he proceeded to Aminu Kano Commercial College between 1992 and 1995.

He attended  Bayero University, Kano, York St John University, and University of California, Yusuf Obtained Advance Diploma in Computer Science at Informatic Kazaure. Jigawa State

Politics 
Yusuf was elected as a Member of Kano State House of Assembly in 2011 Nigerian general election and retained the seat for over two consecutive elections in 2015, and 2019. and is currently serving his third term.

References 

Living people
1976 births
Nigerian Muslims
Candidates in the 2015 Nigerian general election
Bayero University Kano alumni
Politicians from Kano
People from Kano State
21st-century Nigerian politicians